
Gmina Kuślin is a rural gmina (administrative district) in Nowy Tomyśl County, Greater Poland Voivodeship, in west-central Poland.

Villages
Gmina Kuślin contains the villages and settlements of Chraplewo, Dąbrowa, Głuponie, Krystianowo, Kuślin, Michorzewko, Michorzewo, Nowa Dąbrowa, Śliwno, Trzcianka, Turkowo and Wąsowo.

Neighbouring gminas
Gmina Kuślin is bordered by the gminas of Duszniki, Lwówek, Nowy Tomyśl and Opalenica.

References

External links
Polish official population figures 2006

Kuslin
Nowy Tomyśl County